Reksta is an island in the municipality of Kinn in Vestland country, Norway. Most of the inhabitants on Reksta live on the west side in and around the small fishing village of Rognaldsvåg. The population of the island (2001) is 144.

References

Kinn
Islands of Vestland